Epermenia phorticopa is a moth in the family Epermeniidae. It was described by Edward Meyrick in 1921. It is found in India.

The wingspan is about 7 mm. The forewings are dark purplish fuscous, grey speckled and with an obscure grey spot above the tornus. The hindwings are grey.

References

Epermeniidae
Moths described in 1921
Moths of Asia